Mark Birch is an English guitarist, best known for his work with rock band Wishbone Ash.

Musical career
Birch spent much of his musical career gigging in the West Midlands, including playing in bands with Neville MacDonald of Skin.  In the late 1990s, bandmate Bob Skeat recommended Birch to Andy Powell when a guitarist vacancy appeared. Birch joined Wishbone Ash in 1997, performing on the Trance Visionary, Psychic Terrorism, and Bare Bones albums.  He toured extensively with the band, performing lead vocals on songs such as "Persephone" and "Phoenix", before leaving in 2001.

Post-Wishbone Ash
In 2001, Birch left Wishbone Ash to follow a career in web design.

References

Living people
People from Kidderminster
Wishbone Ash members
English rock guitarists
English male guitarists
Year of birth missing (living people)
Web designers